The Upper Valley Nighthawks are a collegiate summer baseball team based in Hartford, Vermont. The team, a member of the New England Collegiate Baseball League (NECBL), plays their home games at the Maxfield Sports Complex. The team began play in 2016 under the direction of the Crane Family. The Cranes previously created and operated the Laconia Muskrats in the NECBL.

History
The team qualified for the playoffs in their first season by winning a 4 team play-in scenario. The Nighthawks, the Vermont Mountaineers, the Keene Swampbats, and the Winnipesaukee Muskrats all tied for the fourth playoff spot in 2016. The Nighthawks defeated the Muskrats in game one and the Swampbats in game two. The Nighthawks were the first team to win a four team play-in and will be the last as the NECBL changed the playoff tie-breaker rules in 2017.

The 2017 team, managed by Jason Szafarski, finished 29-15 and finished in 1st place in the Northern Division. They lost in the Divisional Championship to the eventual NECBL champion Valley Blue Sox. The team had a record 9 NECBL All Stars.

The 2018 team finished 22-21, finishing in fourth place. The team was again managed by Jason Szafarski and produced 5 NECBL All Stars.

The 2019 team finished 24-20, finishing in fourth place. The team was managed by Keller Bradford, a former Nighthawk player and the son of former MLBer Chad Bradford. The team produced 4 NECBL All Stars. Aaron Haase (Wichita State) was named the Joe Nathan Top Relief Pitcher and Cole Frederick won the NECBL batting title (.396). To date, 4 members of the 2019 team have been drafted or signed free-agent contracts.

The 2020 NECBL season was cancelled due to the Coronavirus Pandemic.

The 2021 Nighthawks finished the season 23-18 overall, good for second place in the Northern Division. They survived a 12-inning affair at home against the Winnipesaukee Muskrats in the wildcard round of the playoffs, walking off 7-6 on a bloop single by Brett Callahan (Saint Joseph’s). Upper Valley then swept North Adams (2-0) in the league quarterfinals. They fell in the NECBL semifinals to the North Shore Navigators. This was the furthest the franchise had advanced in the playoffs. The team led the NECBL in BAVG, set the single season record for stolen bases (125), and produced 3 All-NECBL first team selections alongside 7 all-stars, including all-star game MVP Max Viera (Northeastern).

The first Nighthawk alumnus to reach Major League Baseball was Ryan Jeffers. Jeffers made his MLB debut for the Minnesota Twins on August 20 2020.

References

New England Collegiate Baseball League teams
2015 establishments in Vermont
Baseball teams established in 2015
Amateur baseball teams in Vermont
White River Junction, Vermont